St Senan's GAA club is a Gaelic Athletic Association club in the parish of Foynes-Shanagolden-Robertstown, County Limerick, Ireland. The club was founded in 1947 and fields teams solely in Gaelic football.

Location
The club is located in the parish of Foynes-Shanagolden-Robertstown in west Limerick on the southern banks of the Shannon Estuary. The parish is roughly 40 km west of Limerick City on the N69 road.
Neighbouring clubs include Askeaton and Ballysteen to the east, St Kieran's to the south and Gerald Griffin's to the west.

History
Gaelic games have been played in the parish since the late 1880s. The Smith O'Briens team from Foynes were the first organised team and had great success. In 1916 they beat Templeglantine 1-16 to 1-9 in the West final. The following year they went one better and won the only County Senior Football Championship title that ever came to the parish. They defeated the Commercials 1-5 to 0-4 at the Market's Field and were captained by John O'Connor.

During this era hurling was to the fore in the Robertstown and Barrigone areas of the parish. A team called the Liberators won numerous tournaments in the surrounding area. Shanagolden also had a football team called the Shanid Abú's in this era. Records don't give a lot about the period 1910 to 1924. In 1925 Foynes beat Glin 0-9 to 1-4 in the West Junior final and in 1930 Shanagolden won the same competition when they beat Abbeyfeale 1-3 to 0-4. In 1932, Shanagolden lost a final to Ballysteen but beat Foynes in a parish derby a year later by 1-5 to 1-4. This remains the only final contested by two teams from the parish. Foynes reached the County Senior Football final in 1936 but were beaten by the four in a row winning Ahane team of the era.

After Foynes's defeat to Mountcollins in the 1939 West junior final, a lean period hit the parish with no success coming from either Foynes or Shanagolden. The two clubs decided to merge in 1947 and the present-day club of St. Senan's was formed. The first chairman was John 'Cinders' Mulvihill, the first secretary John 'The Boxer' Kenneally and the first treasurer Jimmy Finucane. The newly founded club had great success winning four West Under 16 Championships in a row from 1950–53 and a County Minor Football Championship in 1954 captained by Dónal Mullane.

In 1953 came the breakthrough of winning a first adult county title when Pallasgreen were defeated by 0-6 to 0-4 in the County Junior Football Championship final. The team was captained by Bernie 'The Bowen' Madigan who played for Limerick at the time. Also in 1953, six Senan's men won a County Senior Football Championship with Western Gaels, an amalgamation of Rathkeale, Ballyhahill, Kilcolman and Senan's. West Minor titles were won in 1966 and 1967 but the County finals of the same years were both lost to Old Christians.

A second County Junior title was won in 1973 when the Saints beat Na Piarsaigh 1-10 to 1-7 captained by Joe Behan. A West Junior title was won in 1981 and a County title followed in 1986 as Senan's beat Kilteely-Dromkeen captained by Dónal Mulvihill. Promising underage teams in the 1990s led to a second County Premier Minor Football title in 1997 captained by Mike Flaherty. West Under-21 titles followed and in 2003 they were crowned County Intermediate Football champions after beating Pallasgreen after a replay.

The club went on to contest its first ever County Senior Football final in 2006 but were beaten by Fr. Casey's on a scoreline of 0-12 to 1-7. After nine years at senior level, Senan's were relegated to intermediate in 2012 and lost an Intermediate County final in 2014 to Na Piarsaigh.

Notable people
Pat Lane, who refereed the 1987 All-Ireland Senior Football Championship Final
Ian Ryan, Gaelic footballer

Honours
 Limerick Senior Football Championship Winners (1): 1907 (as Foynes Smith O'Briens). 
 Limerick Senior Football Championship Runners Up (1) : 2006.
 Limerick Intermediate Football Championship (2): 2003, 2017
 Limerick Junior Football Championship (7): 1953, 1973, 1986
 Limerick Premier Minor Football Championship (2): 1954, 1997

References
 One Hundred Years of Glory: A History of Limerick GAA, Ó'Ceallaigh, Séamus & Murphy, Seán, 1984.

External links
 Limerick GAA site

Gaelic games clubs in County Limerick
Hurling clubs in County Limerick
Gaelic football clubs in County Limerick